SS Creekirk was a cargo steamship that was built in Scotland in 1912 and sunk with all hands by a German submarine in 1940. At her launch in 1912 she was named SS Mariston. In her 28-year career she was renamed SS Milcovul in 1913, SS Hyphaestos in 1933 and SS Creekirk in 1938.

Building and first owner
Robert Duncan and Company of Port Glasgow built the ship for W.S. Miller's Ellaston Steam Ship Company of Glasgow and completed her as Mariston in 1912. These fed one three-cylinder triple-expansion steam engine built by Rankin and Blackmore of Greenock. Her engine drove a single screw and was rated at 338 NHP.

Changes of owner and name
In 1913 Maristons owners sold her to Romania Prima Naţională de Navigație Maritimă, who renamed her Milcovul and registered her in Brăila on the River Danube. In August 1916 Romania entered the First World War, and by the end of the year Milcovul had been requisitioned as a transport ship for the Imperial Russian Navy. In 1918 German Empire forces captured her but that November the Central Powers conceded defeat to the Entente Powers and Milcovuls owners recovered her.

Milcovul was in Romania Prima Naţională de Navigație Maritimă's fleet for two decades. When the Russian émigré Alexandre Vlasov took over the company in 1933, Milcovul was sold to Ant. G. Yannoulatos and Sons, who renamed her Hyphaestos and registered her in Piraeus. Yannoulatos ran Hyphaestos for five years and then sold her in 1938 to the Cree Steam Ship Company Ltd of London. Cree renamed the ship Creekirk, registered her in London and appointed Muir, Young Ltd to manage her.

Convoy SC 7 and loss
In autumn 1940 Creekirk loaded 5,900 tons of iron ore at Wabana and Conception Bay in Newfoundland and then sailed to Sydney, Nova Scotia. There she joined Convoy SC 7, which on 5 October sailed for Liverpool. Creekirk was typical of SC 7's 35 merchant ships: old, slow (one source says she could manage only ) and vulnerable. Creekirk had only one DEMS professional military gunner: her armament would have been operated largely by members of her own Merchant Navy crew. At first the convoy had but one escort ship, the  sloop .

On 16 October a wolf pack of U-boats found SC 7 and quickly overwhelmed its inadequate defences. The attack continued for several days, and on 18 October it intensified as the number of U-boats increased. At 2112 hrs Creekirk was in the Western Approaches northwest of Rockall when Fritz Frauenheim's  torpedoed her. She sank quickly with the loss of all hands: her Master Elie Robilliard, 34 crew and her one DEMS gunner.

References

 

1912 ships
Maritime incidents in October 1940
World War I merchant ships of Romania
Ships lost with all hands
Ships sunk by German submarines in World War II
Steamships of Greece
Steamships of the United Kingdom
World War II merchant ships of the United Kingdom